Sir George Roy Denman, KCB, CMG (12 June 1924 – 4 April 2006), commonly known as Roy Denman, was an English civil servant and diplomat. Educated at St John's College, Cambridge, Denman entered the civil service in 1948; as the Second Permanent Secretary of the Cabinet Office from 1975 to 1977, he had responsibility for European issues. He joined the European Commission in 1977 as Director-General for External Affairs, serving until 1982; he was then Ambassador and Head of the European Communities Delegation in Washington from 1982 to 1989.

References

External links 

 The Papers of Sir Roy Denman held at Churchill Archive Centre

1924 births
2006 deaths
English civil servants
British diplomats
Alumni of St John's College, Cambridge
Knights Companion of the Order of the Bath
Companions of the Order of St Michael and St George